Alec Parker (born April 10, 1974) is an American former rugby union lock. Parker was born in Aspen, Colorado.

He was a member of the United States national rugby union team and participated with the squad at the 2007 Rugby World Cup.

References

1974 births
Living people
Rugby union props
American rugby union players
United States international rugby union players
Sportspeople from Aspen, Colorado